The 1997 All-Ireland Minor Football Championship was the 66th staging of the All-Ireland Minor Football Championship, the Gaelic Athletic Association's premier inter-county Gaelic football tournament for boys under the age of 18.

Laois entered the championship as defending champions.

On 28 September 1997, Laois won the championship following a 3-11 to 1-14 defeat of Tyrone in the All-Ireland final. This was their second All-Ireland title overall and their second title in succession.<ref>

Results

Connacht Minor Football Championship

Quarter-Final

Semi-Finals

Final

Leinster Minor Football Championship

Preliminary Round

Quarter-Finals

Semi-Finals

Final

Munster Minor Football Championship

Preliminary Round

Quarter-Final

Semi-Finals

Final

Ulster Minor Football Championship

Preliminary Round

Quarter-Finals

Semi-Finals

Final

All-Ireland Minor Football Championship

Semi-Finals

Final

References

1997
All-Ireland Minor Football Championship